Ride Beyond Vengeance is a 1966 American Western film starring Chuck Connors.

The film was directed by Bernard McEveety and written and produced by Andrew J. Fenady, adapted from the story "The Night of the Tiger" by Al Dewlen. The executive producers included Mark Goodson and Bill Todman, better known as television game show producers. Glenn Yarbrough, then a member of the vocal group The Limeliters, sang the title song. It was released in January 1966. The budget was an estimated $650,000.

Plot

A census taker (James MacArthur) arrives in the Texas town of Cold Iron, with a population of 754. He goes into the local bar for a cold beer, and tells the bartender the town has an unusual number of citizens named "Jonas" and "Reprisal."  He observes a painting above the bar of a violent street fight, with a gun hanging over it. He is then told of the events behind the fight involving a buffalo hunter named Jonas Trapp and the night the local Mexicans still call "The Night of the Reprisal" and "The Night of the Tiger", their name for Jonas.

In flashback, we learn that Jonas Trapp (Connors) is a poor cowboy in love with a wealthy woman named Jessie Larkin (Kathryn Hays). They intend to marry despite the objections of her aunt (Ruth Warrick). The aunt sees Jonas as a man of no prospects and prefers she marry someone more substantial.

To gain the aunt's permission, Jessie pretends to be pregnant. Jonas marries her, but is not happy living off his wife's money. Jonas asks Jessie to go to Dodge City with him so they can live independently on what he can earn as a buffalo hunter. Jessie refuses and Jonas leaves, promising to return. He is gone for eleven years and amasses a small fortune of his own. Jessie believes he is dead after a story reaches her that Jonas was killed by a gunfighter, Clay Allison.

Jonas is returning home when he stumbles over a campfire and is ambushed by three men: Brooks Durham (Rennie), the local banker; John "Johnsy Boy" Hood (Bill Bixby), a sadistic young hustler with a love only of fine clothes and himself; and Coates (Claude Akins), a notorious drunk. Coates accuses Jonas of being a cattle rustler and tries to hang him. Durham grabs his rifle and forces Coates to back down, but Coates and Johnsy brand Jonas with a running iron. He is left for dead and Durham takes his money, seventeen thousand dollars.

A farmer named Hanley finds Jonas and nurses him back to health. Jonas is consumed by a desire for revenge and heads for Cold Iron, where he learns from his father that Jessie's aunt has died and his wife is now engaged to another man - Brooks Durham. When Jessie encounters him on the street, her only reaction is anger over his abandonment, and fear that his return will spoil her prospects of remarriage.

In the course of his remaining in town, Jonas continues hunting for the men who branded him. He takes "Johnsy Boy" Hood on his way back from romancing the lonely wife of a local farmer (Gloria Grahame) in hopes of cheating her out of some money. Under the threat of being "branded and gelded" by Jonas, Hood's sanity cracks. He grabs the hot iron and rams it repeatedly into his stomach as he runs screaming into the woods. He later commits suicide.

Jonas also encounters the saloon bouncer (Buddy Baer), a giant of a man whom Jonas had met the night before. The bouncer doesn't like it that the town is laughing at him for letting Jonas leave the bar with a bottle of liquor that Jonas promised to pay for later, and now wants the money. The resulting fight presages the subject of the painting seen in the framing sequence, and the bouncer is nearly beaten to death. Only the arrival of Jonas' father stops the fight.

Hanley is revealed as one of the rustlers involved with Coates. Coates kills Hanley when the old man denies having Jonas' money. Coates reasons that Durham must have it and tries a little blackmail. Durham threatens to kill Coates, telling him that he used to wear his gun tied to his leg, and he has used it on better men than Coates. But the alcoholic Coates is beyond reasoning. Jonas runs into Durham on the street, the last man on his list, and Durham announces to the town that he branded Jonas like an animal and took his money. He offers to give Jonas his money back but Jonas tells him to go to hell and knocks him down.

Coates, who is on a drunken rampage, attacks Jonas. Coates is eventually beaten to a pulp by Jonas, then killed when he goes for his gun. Jonas wants to be done with violence and leaves his gun on the bar. The flashback ends with Jonas mounted up and on his way out of town. Jessie has Jonas' money and pleads with him to stay, but he refuses and the scene ends with her standing in the street as she watches him ride off. His father tells Jessie to go after Jonas.

The film ends with the bartender showing off the pistol Jonas left behind. The census taker asks what happened to Jessie. The bartender said she left town and neither she nor Jonas was ever heard from again. The census taker doesn't believe Jessie went after Jonas, but the bartender does, saying that "You Can Never Go Home Again" is just a song and "home" is just a word. On the way out of town, the census taker stops to look at Jessie's mansion, now in ruins.

Cast

Alternate titles 
 Night of the Tiger
 The Tiger Wore Guns (USA) (working title)
 You Can't Ever Go Home Again (USA) (working title)

References

External links 
 
 Ride Beyond Vengeance at Turner Classic Movies
 
 

1966 films
1966 Western (genre) films
American Western (genre) films
Columbia Pictures films
Films scored by Richard Markowitz
Films directed by Bernard McEveety Jr.
1966 directorial debut films
1960s English-language films
1960s American films